M. Sundardas is an Indian politician three times Member of Legislative assembly. He was elected to Tamil Nadu legislative assembly from Vilavancode constituency in 1984, 1989 and 1991 elections as an Indian National Congress candidate.

References 

People from Kanyakumari district
Indian National Congress politicians from Tamil Nadu
Living people
Year of birth missing (living people)
Tamil Nadu MLAs 1991–1996

Tamil Nadu MLAs 1985–1989